Rochell & the Candles  were a one hit wonder group from Los Angeles California. They had a hit in 1961 with "Once Upon A Time".

Background
The group came together in 1958  in Los Angeles. The line up of all males then was Rochell Henderson who sang lead and tenor, Johnny Wyatt who was lead and first tenor, Melvin Sasso who was tenor, and T.C. Henderson who sang bass. The two Hendersons who both came from Louisiana were not related. Rochell Henderson was once in a group called The Chosen Gospel singers which included Lou Rawls.

Their hit "Once Upon a Time" made it to number 20 in the R&B charts and number 26 in the pop charts. It spent a total of three weeks in the pop charts.

In July, 1962, they released "Each Night" bw "Turn Her Down" on Challenge 9158. The A side was composed by Willie Morris and the B side by K. C. Reeth and Robt. J. Hafner.

Their hit appears on the 16 All Time Great Rare Original Oldies various artists compilation issued on Del-Fi Records.

Later years
Between 1966 and 1967, Johnny Wyatt had some solo singles released on the Bronco label.  He died in 1983.

Discography (USA)

References

Del-Fi Records artists
Challenge Records (1950s) artists
Swingin' Records artists